Malang is a city in East Java, Indonesia.

Malang  may also refer to:

Places 
Malang Regency, a regency in East Java
 Deh-e Malang
 Malang Plain
 Malang Shahwala
 Ziarat-e Malang, village in Iran
 Malang State University
Malang railway station
 Malang gad, place in Bombay, India; it's also known as Shree Malang gad

People 
Malang (painter) (1928–2017), Filipino cartoonist, illustrator, and fine arts painter
Malang Diedhiou (born 1973), Senegalese association football referee
Sher Malang, Afghan politician
Malang Sarr (born 1999), French professional footballer

Entertainment  
"Malang" (song), a 2013 Hindi song by Pritam feat. Siddharth Mahadevan and Shilpa Rao
 Malang (film), an Indian Hindi-language romantic thriller film

Other uses 
 Malang language (disambiguation)